Queen Shoals is an unincorporated community in Clay County, West Virginia, United States. Its post office  has been closed.

The community was named after nearby Queen Shoal Creek.

Gallery

References 

Unincorporated communities in West Virginia
Unincorporated communities in Clay County, West Virginia
Charleston, West Virginia metropolitan area
Coal towns in West Virginia